UAF eCampus is currently the home of all online course offerings at the University of Alaska Fairbanks. UAF eCampus was renamed from UAF eLearning in fall of 2018, and previously known as the Center for Distance Education, which was founded in 1987.

UAF eCampus is housed under the Office of the Provost at the University of Alaska Fairbanks .

External links 
 University of Alaska Fairbanks
 UAF eCampus Website

Distance education institutions based in the United States
University of Alaska Fairbanks